Depressaria pimpinellae is a moth of the family Depressariidae. It is found in most of Europe, except Ireland, Portugal and most of the Balkan Peninsula.

The wingspan is 16–22 mm. Adults are on wing from September and after overwintering, again in the following spring.

The larvae feed on Pimpinella saxifraga and Pimpinella major. They live in a silken spinning.

References

External links
lepiforum.de

Moths described in 1839
Depressaria
Moths of Europe